The FIFA Club World Cup is an international association football competition organised by the Fédération Internationale de Football Association (FIFA), the sport's global governing body. The championship was first contested as the FIFA Club World Championship in 2000. It was not held between 2001 and 2004 due to a combination of factors, most importantly the collapse of FIFA's marketing partner International Sport and Leisure. Following a change in format which saw the FIFA Club World Championship absorb the Intercontinental Cup, it was relaunched in 2005 and took its current name the season afterwards.

The current format of the tournament involves seven teams competing for the title at venues within the host nation over a period of about two weeks; the winners of that year's edition of the Asian AFC Champions League, African CAF Champions League, North American CONCACAF Champions League, South American Copa Libertadores, Oceanian OFC Champions League and European UEFA Champions League, along with the host nation's national champion, participate in a straight knockout tournament.

Spanish club Real Madrid leads the table in most titles, most wins and most points. Auckland City have the most tournament appearances with ten, while Al Ahly have played the most matches (22), also holding the dubious record of the most losses with a total of thirteen. There are four teams who have won all of their games in the competition on the quest to their respective title or titles, those being Internazionale, Milan, São Paulo (two wins each) and Bayern Munich (four wins).

Key legend 
 

 Nat. = Nationality
 Apps = Appearances
 Pld = Played
 W = Games won
 D = Games drawn
 L = Games lost
 PPG = Points per game

 GF = Goals for
 GA = Goals against
 GD = Goal difference
 % = Points percentage

All-time table
Correct after the 2022 tournament:

References

External links
 
 All-time table at weltfussball.de

FIFA Club World Cup
All-time football league tables